The 162nd New York State Legislature, consisting of the New York State Senate and the New York State Assembly, met from January 4, 1939, to October 22, 1940, during the seventh and eight years of Herbert H. Lehman's governorship, in Albany.

Background
Under the provisions of the New York Constitution of 1894, re-apportioned in 1917, 51 Senators and 150 assemblymen were elected in single-seat districts. The senatorial districts consisted either of one or more entire counties; or a contiguous area within a single county. The counties which were divided into more than one senatorial district were New York (nine districts), Kings (eight), Bronx (three), Erie (three), Monroe (two), Queens (two) and Westchester (two). The Assembly districts were made up of contiguous area, all within the same county.

In November 1937, an amendment to the State Constitution to increase the term in office of the members of the New York State Assembly to two years, and of the statewide elected state officers (Governor, Lieutenant Governor, Comptroller, Attorney General) to four years, was accepted. Thus, beginning at the state election in 1938, all members (senators and assemblymen) of the Legislature were elected to two-year terms.

At this time there were two major political parties: the Democratic Party and the Republican Party. The American Labor Party, the Socialist Party and the Communist Party also nominated tickets. The Socialist Labor Party nominated an "Industrial Government" ticket. The Republicans also nominated an "Independent Progressive" ticket so that their nominee Thomas E. Dewey would appear in two columns on the ballot, like Gov. Lehman who was endorsed by the American Labor Party. In New York City, "City Fusion", "Progressive" and "Liberal" tickets were also nominated.

Elections
The New York state election, 1938, was held on November 8. Governor Herbert H. Lehman was re-elected, and Charles Poletti was elected Lieutenant Governor, both Democrats endorsed by the American Labor Party. The other six statewide elective offices were also carried by the Democrats. The approximate party strength at this election, as expressed by the vote for Governor, was: Republicans 2,303,000; Democrats 1,971,000;  American Labor 420,000; Communists 106,000; Socialists 25,000; Independent Progressives 24,000; and Industrial Government 3,500.

Both woman legislators—State Senator Rhoda Fox Graves (Rep.), of Gouverneur, and Assemblywoman Jane H. Todd (Rep.), of Tarrytown—were re-elected.

The New York state election, 1939, was held on November 7. Two vacancies in the State Senate and six vacancies in the State Assembly were filled. Edith C. Cheney, the widow of Assemblyman Guy W. Cheney, was elected to the seat previously held by her husband.

Sessions
The Legislature met for the first regular session (the 162nd) at the State Capitol in Albany on January 4, 1939; and adjourned on May 20.

Oswald D. Heck (Rep.) was re-elected Speaker.

Perley A. Pitcher (Rep.) was elected Temporary President of the State Senate. Pitcher died on February 20, 1939.

On February 27, 1939, Joe R. Hanley (Rep.) was elected Temporary President of the State Senate.

The Legislature met for a special session at the State Capitol in Albany on June 23, 1939; and adjourned on July 10. This session was called because the New York Court of Appeals had declared the state budget, enacted during the regular session, as unconstitutional, and a new budget was required to be made.

The Legislature met for the second regular session (the 163rd) at the State Capitol in Albany on January 3, 1940; and adjourned at half past midnight on March 31.

The Legislature met for another special session at the State Capitol in Albany on October 22, 1940; and adjourned after a session of four hours. This session was held to enact an extension of three hours to the voting time on the next election day, so that the polls would close at 9 p.m. instead of at 6 p.m.

On November 16, the State Senate rejected, with a vote of 29 to 18, the removal from office of Kings County Judge George W. Martin.

State Senate

Districts

Members
The asterisk (*) denotes members of the previous Legislature who continued in office as members of this Legislature. Peter H. Ruvolo, Phelps Phelps, Carl Pack, Fred A. Young and James W. Riley changed from the Assembly to the Senate at the beginning of this Legislature. Assemblymen Daniel Gutman and Chauncey B. Hammond were elected to fill vacancies in the Senate.

Note: For brevity, the chairmanships omit the words "...the Committee on (the)..."

Employees
 Clerk: William S. King
 Assistant Clerk: Fred J. Slater

State Assembly

Assemblymen

Note: For brevity, the chairmanships omit the words "...the Committee on (the)..."

Employees
 Clerk: Ansley B. Borkowski

Notes

Sources
 N.Y. State Legislature—1939–40 in The State Employee (November 1938, Vol. 7, No. 8, pg. 14 and 16)
 Members of the New York Senate (1930s) at Political Graveyard
 Members of the New York Assembly (1930s) at Political Graveyard
 Standing Committees of Legislature in The State Employee (February 1939, Vol. 8, No. 2, pg. 34)

162
1939 in New York (state)
1940 in New York (state)
1939 U.S. legislative sessions
1940 U.S. legislative sessions